An election to the electoral county of Dún Laoghaire–Rathdown within Dublin County to Dublin County Council took place on 20 June 1985 as part of that year's Irish local elections. Councillors were elected from local electoral areas on the system of proportional representation by means of the single transferable vote voting for a six-year term of office.

Dún Laoghaire–Rathdown was one of three electoral counties in Dublin County established by the Local Government (Reorganisation) Act 1985. The county electoral areas of Ballybrack, Blackrock and Dún Laoghaire served as the relevant electoral areas for the election to the corporation of Dun Laoghaire.

Results by LEA

Ballybrack

Blackrock

Clonskeagh

Dundrum

Dún Laoghaire

Glencullen

Stillorgan

External links
 IrelandElection.com
 irishelectionliterature

References

1985 Irish local elections
History of County Dublin